The 2020 New Hampshire Republican presidential primary took place on Tuesday, February 11, 2020, as the second nominating contest in the Republican Party presidential primaries for the 2020 presidential election, following the Iowa caucuses the week before. The New Hampshire primary is a semi-closed primary, meaning that only Republicans and independents may vote in this primary.

Incumbent president Donald Trump won the primary with 84.4 percent of the vote, clinching all of the state's 22 pledged delegates to the national convention. Despite Bill Weld winning 9% of the vote, President Trump received the most votes (129,734) in the New Hampshire primary for an incumbent candidate in U.S. history, moving past the previous record-holder, Bill Clinton, in 1996 (76,797).

Procedure
The state's ballot access laws have been traditionally lenient, with prospective presidential candidates only required to pay a $1,000 fee to secure a line on the primary ballot.

Primary elections are scheduled to be held on Tuesday, February 11, 2020, with the vast majority of polling places closed by 7 p.m. and 13 cities allowed to close at 8 p.m. In this semi-closed Republican primary, candidates must meet a viability threshold of 10 percent at the statewide level in order to be considered viable. New Hampshire's pledged delegates to the 2020 Republican National Convention are then allocated proportionally to candidates who received 10% or more of the vote.

Candidates on the ballot
The following candidates were on the ballot, and listed in order of filing: 

Rocky De La Fuente, California
Rick Kraft, New Mexico
Donald Trump, Florida
Star Locke, Texas  
Robert Ardini, New York
Eric Merrill, New Hampshire  
Stephen B. Comley Sr., Massachusetts
Bob Ely, Illinois 
Zoltan Istvan, California 
Matthew John Matern, California 
"President" R. Boddie, Georgia
Larry Horn, Oregon
Bill Weld, Massachusetts
Juan Payne, Alabama 
Joe Walsh, Illinois
William N. Murphy, New Hampshire 
Mary Maxwell, New Hampshire

Campaign
All the major candidates, as well as many minor ones, had events in the state starting in 2018.

The famous Lesser-Known Candidates Forum took place on January 28, the latest it has ever been held. Robert Ardini, President R. Boddie, Stephen Comley, Zoltan Istvan, Mary Maxwell, and Bill Murphy participated.

Polling

Results
Typically, the top candidates of the other major party receive a large number of write-in votes.

See also
 2020 New Hampshire Democratic presidential primary
 New Hampshire midnight voting

References

New Hampshire Republican
Republican primary
2020